The 123rd Pennsylvania Volunteer Infantry was an infantry regiment that served in the Union Army during the American Civil War.

Service
The 123rd Pennsylvania Infantry was organized at Allegheny City, Pennsylvania, and mustered in August 1862 for nine month's service under the command of Colonel John B. Clark.

The regiment was attached to 2nd Brigade, 3rd Division, V Corps, Army of the Potomac, to May 1863.

The 123rd Pennsylvania Infantry mustered out May 13, 1863.

Detailed service
Moved to Harrisburg, Pa., then to Washington, D.C., August 20-23, 1862. Maryland Campaign September 6-24, 1862. Duty at Sharpsburg, Md., until October 30. Movement to Falmouth, Va., October 30-November 19. Battle of Fredericksburg December 12-15. Burnside's 2nd Campaign, "Mud March," January 20-24, 1863. Duty at Falmouth until April 27. Chancellorsville Campaign April 27-May 6. Battle of Chancellorsville May 1-5.

Casualties
The regiment lost a total of 72 men during service; 3 officers and 27 enlisted men killed or mortally wounded, 1 officer and 41 enlisted men died of disease.

Commanders
 Colonel John B. Clark

See also

 List of Pennsylvania Civil War Units
 Pennsylvania in the Civil War

References
 Dyer, Frederick H. A Compendium of the War of the Rebellion (Des Moines, IA: Dyer Pub. Co.), 1908.
 Lang, Scott B. The Forgotten Charge: The 123rd Pennsylvania at Marye's Heights, Fredericksburg, Virginia (Shippensburg, PA: White Mane Books), 2002. 
Attribution

External links
 National and state flags of the 123rd Pennsylvania Infantry

Military units and formations established in 1862
Military units and formations disestablished in 1863
Units and formations of the Union Army from Pennsylvania